David Grimm (24 January 1864 St. Petersburg – 29 July 1941 Riga) was a Russian Imperial and then Estonian lawyer and politician. He was a member of Estonian National Assembly.

References

1864 births
1941 deaths
Politicians from Saint Petersburg
People from Sankt-Peterburgsky Uyezd
Russian Constitutional Democratic Party members
Members of the State Council (Russian Empire)
Members of the Estonian National Assembly
Lawyers from Saint Petersburg
20th-century Estonian lawyers
Recipients of the Order of St. Anna, 2nd class
Recipients of the Order of St. Anna, 3rd class
Recipients of the Order of Saint Stanislaus (Russian), 2nd class
Recipients of the Order of Saint Stanislaus (Russian), 3rd class
Recipients of the Order of St. Vladimir, 4th class